Double Indemnity is a 1944 American crime film noir directed by Billy Wilder, co-written by Wilder and Raymond Chandler, and produced by Buddy DeSylva and Joseph Sistrom. The screenplay was based on James M. Cain's 1943 novel of the same title, which appeared as an eight-part serial for Liberty magazine in February 1936.

The film stars Fred MacMurray as an insurance salesman, Barbara Stanwyck as a provocative housewife who is accused of killing her husband, and Edward G. Robinson as a claims adjuster whose job is to find phony claims. The term "double indemnity" refers to a clause in certain life insurance policies that doubles the payout in cases when the death is accidental.

Praised by many critics when first released, the film was nominated for seven Academy Awards, but did not win any. Widely regarded as a classic, it often is cited as having set the standard for film noir. Several publications have deemed it one of the greatest films of all time. Deemed "culturally, historically, or aesthetically significant" by the U.S. Library of Congress in 1992, Double Indemnity was selected for preservation in the National Film Registry. In 1998, it was ranked No. 38 on the American Film Institute's list of the 100 best American films of all time, and in 2007 it placed 29th on their 10th Anniversary list. Wilder considered Double Indemnity his best film in terms of having the fewest scripting and shooting errors, and always maintained that the two things he was proudest of in his career were the compliments he received from Cain about Double Indemnity and from Agatha Christie for his handling of her Witness for the Prosecution.

Plot

On July 16, 1938, insurance salesman Walter Neff returns to his office in Downtown Los Angeles with a gunshot wound on his shoulder. He records a confession on a dictaphone for his friend and colleague, claims adjuster Barton Keyes. A flashback ensues.

In May, 1937, Walter meets the alluring Phyllis Dietrichson during a house call to remind her husband to renew his automobile insurance policy. They flirt, until Phyllis asks about buying an accident insurance policy for her husband—without his knowledge. Walter deduces Phyllis is contemplating murder and, wanting no part of it, he picks up his hat and quickly leaves. Later, Phyllis shows up at Walter's apartment and uses the excuse of the latter forgetting his hat to seduce him to murder her husband. The plan is to trick Dietrichson into signing what he thinks is a renewal. The policy has a double indemnity clause that pays double for an accidental death due to rare circumstances.

Later, Phyllis drives her husband to the train station to attend his college reunion. Walter hides in the back seat, kills him and boards the train posing as Mr. Dietrichson. After the train gets underway, Walter goes to the outdoor platform at the back, ostensibly to smoke. He jumps off at a prearranged spot to meet Phyllis and drag Dietrichson's body onto the tracks.

Norton, the company's president, believes the death was suicide, but Keyes dismisses this theory. Soon, however, he begins to have doubts about the claim's legitimacy. Keyes tells Walter his theory while Phyllis hides behind the door: that she had an accomplice murder Dietrichson for the insurance money. However, he has no proof.

The victim's daughter, Lola, tells Walter she is convinced that her stepmother Phyllis is behind her father's death. Lola's mother also died under suspicious circumstances, and Phyllis was her nurse. Realizing Phyllis has killed before, Walter begins seeing Lola to keep her from going to the police with her suspicions, and later through guilt and to protect her from her stepmother. Walter fears Phyllis will murder Lola over her suspicions and because Dietrichson had changed his will in Lola's favor, Phyllis would inherit nothing.

Keyes finds a witness who says the man on the train was younger than the dead man. Walter warns Phyllis that pursuing the insurance claim in court risks exposing the murder. He tries to convince her to lie low and let him try to convince Norton to pay out the claim.

Lola tells Walter she has discovered that her boyfriend, the hotheaded Nino Zachette, has been seeing Phyllis behind her back. Walter confronts Phyllis and tells her that he knows about her and Zachette. He guesses she is planning for Zachette to kill Lola and him, but tells her that he intends to kill her and frame Zachette. Phyllis shoots Walter in the shoulder, but finds herself unable to finish him off, realizing that she cares for someone else for the first time in her life. Walter does not believe Phyllis and kills her. He waits for Zachette and advises him not to enter the house. He convinces him to call Lola.

Walter drives to the office and turns on the dictaphone, returning to the start of the film. Keyes arrives unnoticed and hears the truth. Walter tells him he is fleeing to Mexico, but collapses. Keyes lights a cigarette for Walter, while waiting for the police and an ambulance.

Cast

Uncredited
 Raymond Chandler cameo as a man reading a magazine outside Keyes' office as Neff exits
 Bess Flowers as Norton's secretary
 Betty Farrington as Nettie, Dietrichson's maid
 Teala Loring as Pacific All-Risk Insurance telephone operator
 Sam McDaniel as Charlie, Garage Attendant
 Miriam Nelson as Keyes' secretary
 Douglas Spencer as Lou Schwartz, Neff's office mate

Production

Background
James M. Cain based his novella on a 1927 murder perpetrated by a married woman from the New York City borough of Queens and her lover, whose trial he attended while working as a journalist in New York. In that crime, Ruth Snyder persuaded her boyfriend, Judd Gray, to kill her husband Albert after having him take out a big insurance policy – with a double-indemnity clause. The murderers were quickly identified, arrested and convicted. The front page photo of Snyder's execution in the electric chair at Sing Sing, captured by reporter Tom Howard using a hidden camera attached to his right ankle, has been called the most famous newsphoto of the 1920s.

Double Indemnity began making the rounds in Hollywood shortly after it was published in Liberty magazine in 1936. Cain had made a name for himself the year before with The Postman Always Rings Twice, a story of murder and passion between a migrant worker and the unhappy wife of a café owner. Cain's agent sent copies of the novella to all the major studios and within days, MGM, Warner Bros., Paramount, 20th Century-Fox, and Columbia were competing to buy the rights for $25,000. Then a letter went from Joseph Breen at the Hays Office, and the studios withdrew their bids at once. In it, Breen warned:

The general low tone and sordid flavor of this story makes it, in our judgment, thoroughly unacceptable for screen presentation before mixed audiences in the theater. I am sure you will agree that it is most important ... to avoid what the code calls "the hardening of audiences," especially those who are young and impressionable, to the thought and fact of crime.

Eight years later, the novella was added to the collection of Cain's works titled Three of a Kind. Paramount executive Joseph Sistrom thought the material was perfect for Wilder, and the studio bought the rights for $15,000. Paramount resubmitted the script to the Hays Office, but the response was identical to the one eight years earlier. Wilder, Paramount executive William Dozier and Sistrom decided to move forward anyway. They submitted a film treatment crafted by Wilder and his writing partner Charles Brackett, and this time the Hays Office approved the project with only a few objections: the portrayal of the disposal of the body, a proposed gas-chamber execution scene, and the skimpiness of the towel worn by the female lead in her first scene.

Cain maintained that Joseph Breen owed him $10,000 for vetoing the property back in 1935 when he would have received $25,000.

Writing

After Paramount purchased the rights to the novella for Wilder, the next step was a screenplay. The property was regarded around Hollywood as unfilmable because of its iniquitous characters and the restrictions imposed by the Motion Picture Production Code. Although he had worked on the treatment, Charles Brackett decided it was too sordid and bowed out of the project, leaving Wilder to find another collaborator. His first choice, Cain was working for another studio and unavailable (although Cain claimed he never asked). Producer Joseph Sistrom, an avid reader and an admirer of The Big Sleep, then suggested Raymond Chandler.

Wilder later recalled with disappointment his first meeting with Chandler. Envisioning a former private detective who had worked his own experiences into gritty prose, he instead met a man he later described as looking like an accountant. Chandler was new to Hollywood, but saw it as a golden opportunity. Not realizing that he would be collaborating with Wilder, he demanded $1,000 and said he needed at least a week to complete the screenplay, to which Wilder and Sistrom simply looked at one another in amazement. To help guide him in writing a screenplay, Wilder gave Chandler a copy of his own screenplay for the 1941 Hold Back the Dawn to study. After the first weekend, Chandler presented 80 pages that Wilder characterized as "useless camera instruction"; Wilder quickly put it aside and informed Chandler that they would be working together, slowly and meticulously. By all accounts, the pair did not get along during their four months together. At one point Chandler even quit, submitting a long list of grievances to Paramount as to why he could no longer work with Wilder. Wilder, however, stuck it out, admiring Chandler's gift with words and knowing that his dialogue would translate very well to the screen.

Chandler and Wilder made considerable changes to Cain's story. For one thing, the ending was overhauled. For another, the character of Barton Keyes was changed from a fairly clueless co-worker into an enemy mentor.

Initially, Wilder and Chandler had intended to retain as much of Cain's original dialogue as possible. It was Chandler who first realized that the dialogue from the novella did not translate well to the screen. Wilder disagreed and was annoyed that Chandler was not putting more of it into the script. To settle it, Wilder hired a couple of contract players from the studio to read passages of Cain's original dialogue aloud. To Wilder's astonishment, Chandler was right, and in the end, the movie's cynical and provocative dialogue was more Chandler and Wilder than it was Cain. Chandler also did a lot of fieldwork while working on the script and took large volumes of notes. By visiting various locations that figured into the film, he brought a sense of realism about Los Angeles that seeped into the script. For example, he hung around Jerry's Market on Melrose Avenue in preparation for the scene during which Phyllis and Walter discreetly meet to plan the murder.

The tumultuous relationship between Wilder and Chandler only enhanced the product of their collaboration. Wilder, in fact, believed that discord, a tug-of-war, was a vital ingredient, necessary for a fruitful collaboration: "If two people think alike," he once said, "it's like two men pulling at one end of a rope. If you are going to collaborate, you need an opponent to bounce things off of." His tugging with Chandler did have a softer side, it seems: Over 60 years after the film's initial release, mystery writer and Chandler scholar Mark Coggins documented the fact that Chandler had agreed to appear in a cameo at 16 minutes into the film, glancing up from a magazine as Neff walks past outside Keyes' office. This is significant because, other than a snippet from a home movie, there is no other footage of Chandler known anywhere.

When Chandler came to work with Wilder, he was a recovering alcoholic. Wilder said: "He was in Alcoholics Anonymous, and I think he had a tough time with me – I drove him back into drinking." By the time the picture was released, Chandler was disillusioned with the writers' lot in Hollywood; he published an angry piece titled "Writers in Hollywood" for The Atlantic Monthly in November 1945 in which he complained: "The first picture I worked on was nominated for an Academy Award (if that means anything), but I was not even invited to the press review held right in the studio." He neglected, however, to mention that the studio had kept him on salary during the eight-week shooting schedule and that no changes to the script were allowed without his approval – a very rare accommodation for screenwriters, particularly newcomers, in those days. Offended, Wilder responded by saying: "We didn't invite him? How could we? He was under the table drunk at Lucy's," a nearby watering hole for Paramount employees. This relationship with Chandler is what drew Wilder to his next film, The Lost Weekend, about an alcoholic writer. Wilder made the film, in part, "to explain Chandler to himself."

Cain was impressed with the way his book turned out on the screen. After seeing the picture half a dozen times, he was quoted as saying "It's the only picture I ever saw made from my books that had things in it I wish I had thought of. Wilder's ending was much better than my ending, and his device for letting the guy tell the story by taking out the office dictating machine – I would have done it if I had thought of it."

Wilder's and Brackett's estrangement during Double Indemnity was not a permanent one. Years later, Wilder characterized their time apart as just another kind of adultery: "1944 was 'The Year of Infidelities, he said. "Charlie produced The Uninvited ... I wrote Double Indemnity with Raymond Chandler ... I don't think he ever forgave me. He always thought I cheated on him with Raymond Chandler." Brackett spun the breakup in a decidedly different light, saying "Billy got so despondent at being without me that we did The Lost Weekend, a depressing film about a writer who has trouble writing." The Lost Weekend was a distinguished offspring for the reconciled partnership – they left Oscar night with three Awards: Best Picture for producer Brackett, Best Director for Wilder, and a shared pair of statuettes for both for Best Screenplay. They worked together through Sunset Boulevard in 1950, then split for good.

Wilder and Chandler's Double Indemnity screenplay was included in Library of America's second volume of Chandler's work, Later Novels and Other Writings (1995). This volume also includes the aforementioned "Writers in Hollywood" piece by Chandler.

Casting

Having the two protagonists mortally wound each other was one of the key factors in gaining Hays Office approval for the script: the Production Code demanded that criminals pay, on screen, for their transgressions. In addition, Double Indemnity broke new cinematic ground on several fronts, one of these being the first time a Hollywood film explicitly explored the means, motives, and opportunity of committing a murder. It took skillful performers to bring nuance to these treacherous characters, and casting the roles of Walter Neff and Phyllis Dietrichson was a challenge for Wilder.

Sistrom's and Wilder's first choice for the role of Phyllis Dietrichson was Barbara Stanwyck. At the time, Stanwyck was the highest-paid actress in Hollywood and the highest-paid woman in America. (Her eventual co-star MacMurray matched Stanwyck's prominence at the pay window: in 1943, he was the highest-paid actor in Hollywood, and the fourth highest-paid American.) Given the nature of the role, Stanwyck was reluctant to take the part, fearing it would have an adverse effect on her career. According to Stanwyck:
I said "I love the script and I love you, but I am a little afraid after all these years of playing heroines to go into an out-and-out killer." And Mr. Wilder – and rightly so – looked at me and he said "Well, are you a mouse or an actress?" And I said "Well, I hope I'm an actress." He said "Then do the part". And I did and I'm very grateful to him.

The character of Walter Neff was not only a heel, he was a weak and malleable heel – many Hollywood actors, including Alan Ladd, James Cagney, Spencer Tracy, Gregory Peck and Fredric March passed on it. Wilder recalls "scraping the bottom of the barrel" and approaching George Raft. Raft was illiterate, so Wilder had to tell him the plot. About halfway through, Raft interrupted him with "Let's get to the lapel bit." "What lapel bit?" a bewildered Wilder replied. "The lapel," the actor said, annoyed by such stupidity. "You know, when the guy flashes his lapel, you see his badge, you know he's a detective." This was his vision of the film, and because it wasn't part of the story, Raft turned the part down. (This was the last in a series of roles turned down by Raft in films which turned out to be classics.)

Wilder finally realized that the part should be played by someone who could not only be a cynic, but a nice guy as well.

Fred MacMurray was accustomed to playing "happy-go-lucky good guys" in light comedies, and when Wilder first approached him about the role, MacMurray said "You're making the mistake of your life!" Playing a serious role required acting, he said "and I can't do it." But Wilder pestered him about it every single day – at home, in the studio commissary, in his dressing room, on the sidewalk – until he simply wore the actor down. MacMurray felt safe about his acquiescence because Paramount, which had him under contract and had carefully crafted his good guy image, would never let him play a "wrong" role. His trust, however, was misplaced: His contract was up for renewal at the time, and because his friend and co-star Carole Lombard had shrewdly and successfully taught him how to play hardball with the studio bosses, he was not the pliable pushover of old. Paramount executives decided to let him play the unsavory role to teach him a lesson. A lesson was indeed taught, but not the one Paramount had in mind. MacMurray made a great heel and his performance demonstrated new breadths of his acting talent. "I never dreamed it would be the best picture I ever made," he said.

Edward G. Robinson was reluctant to sign on for the role of Barton Keyes, but not for the same reasons as MacMurray and Stanwyck. Having been a star since Little Caesar in 1930, this role represented a step downward to the third lead. Robinson later admitted "At my age, it was time to begin thinking of character roles, to slide into middle and old age with the same grace as that marvelous actor Lewis Stone". It also helped, as he freely admitted, that he drew the same salary as the two leads for fewer shooting days.

Filming

The original ending to the Cain novella called for the characters to commit double suicide. Suicide, however, was strictly forbidden at the time by the Production Code as a way to resolve a plot, so Wilder wrote and filmed a different ending in which Neff goes to the gas chamber while Keyes watches. This scene was shot before the scenes that eventually became the film's familiar ending, and once that final intimate exchange between Neff and Keyes revealed its power to Wilder, he began to wonder if the gas chamber ending was needed at all. "You couldn't have a more meaningful scene between two men", Wilder said. He later recounted: "The story was between the two guys. I knew it, even though I had already filmed the gas chamber scene ... So we just took out the scene in the gas chamber," despite its $150,000 cost to the studio. Removal of the scene, over Chandler's objection, removed Production Code head Joseph Breen's single biggest remaining objection to the picture that regarded it as "unduly gruesome" and predicted that it never would be approved by local and regional censor boards. The footage and sound elements are lost, but production stills of the scene still exist.

The look of the film was achieved through the work of cinematographer John F. Seitz. At the time, Seitz was the premier director of photography on the Paramount lot; his work extended back to the silent era. Wilder had worked with Seitz on his previous film, Five Graves to Cairo, for which Seitz was nominated for an Academy Award, and Wilder praised Seitz's willingness to experiment and fail. Here Wilder taps into his 1920s Berlin roots, and he and Seitz give the film a look subtly reminiscent of German expressionism, with dramatic deployment of light and shadows. "He was ready for anything", Wilder said. "Sometimes the rushes were so dark that you couldn't see anything. He went to the limits of what could be done." They contrasted the bright sunny Southern California exteriors, shot on location, with dark, gloomy, rotten interiors shot on sound stages to give the audience a sense of what lurks just beneath the facade – and just who is capable of murder. The contrast was heightened, in Wilder's words, by "dirtying up" the sets. Once the set was ready for filming, Wilder went around and overturned a few ashtrays to give the house an appropriately grubby look. Wilder and Seitz also blew aluminum particles into the air so that, as they floated down, they looked just like dust.

Another technique Seitz used was "venetian blind" lighting which almost gives the illusion of prison bars trapping the characters. Barbara Stanwyck later reflected: "for an actress, let me tell you the way those sets were lit, the house, Walter's apartment, those dark shadows, those slices of harsh light at strange angles – all that helped my performance. The way Billy staged it and John Seitz lit it, it was all one sensational mood."

For Neff's office at Pacific All Risk, Wilder and set designer Hal Pereira conspired to create a little in-house joke, typical of Billy Wilder. In the opening scenes, as Walter Neff stumbles off the elevator on his way to his office to record his confession, the vast two-tiered office is empty and dark. With the camera following him, Neff lurches towards the balcony railing overlooking rows and rows of uniform corporate desks. Neff turns left, but the camera continues forward until it reaches the brink and stares down for an anxious moment into a colorless American business purgatory. Here, Pereira is said to have copied an existing office: the corporate headquarters of Paramount Pictures in New York City.

Wilder decked Stanwyck out in the blonde wig "to complement her anklet ... and to make her look as sleazy as possible." This wig has been cited by some as being the picture's biggest flaw, claiming that it looks too "fake". According to Wilder, this was exactly what he was going for when he chose the wig, wanting to project "the phoniness of the girl – Bad taste, phony wig", with cheap perfume to match. Unconvinced, Paramount production head Buddy DeSylva was overheard to say "We hired Barbara Stanwyck, and here we get George Washington."

The production was not without its lucky accidents: The company had just finished shooting the final segment of the sequence where Phyllis and Walter make their getaway after dumping their victim's body on the tracks. The crew was breaking for lunch before striking the set. In the script, the pair get in their car and simply drive away. But as Wilder got into his own car to leave, it wouldn't start. Inspired, he ran back and ordered the crew back. Wilder reshot the scene, only this time as Phyllis starts the car, the motor stalls and won't turn over. She tries several more times, but the car won't start and the two look at each other in growing panic. Walter desperately reaches over, turns the key and guns the motor, finally starting the car. Only then do they speed away from the crime scene. The result was one of the more suspenseful scenes in the film, but was not in the original script. MacMurray was surprised when he first saw it onscreen: "When I  ... turned the key I remember I was doing it fast and Billy kept saying 'Make it longer, make it longer,' and finally I yelled 'For Chrissake Billy, it's not going to hold that long,' and he said 'Make it longer,' and he was right."

Wilder managed to bring the whole production in under budget at $927,262 despite $370,000 in salaries for just four people ($100,000 each for MacMurray, Stanwyck, and Robinson, and $70,000 – $44,000 for writing and $26,000 for directing – for himself).

Music

The score to Double Indemnity was composed by Miklós Rózsa, whose work on Wilder's previous film Five Graves to Cairo had been his first real Hollywood engagement for a major studio. Wilder had praised that work and promised to use Rózsa on his next film. Wilder had the idea of using a restless string tremolo (as in the opening to Franz Schubert's Unfinished Symphony) to reflect the conspiratorial activities of Walter and Phyllis against her husband which Rózsa felt was a good one (and the symphony is actually used with a very melodramatic effect in the scene with Lola and Walter in the hill above Hollywood Bowl, 1:23–1:26). As work progressed, Wilder's enthusiasm about Rózsa's score only grew, but the studio's Musical Director Louis Lipstone was of a different mind; he and Wilder previously clashed over some post-production cuts he had made to the Five Graves score which created problems with the music's continuity and logic. Now the two were coming to loggerheads again.

When it came time to record the score for Double Indemnity, Lipstone made no secret that he despised what Rózsa had done, to which Wilder finally turned to him and snapped "You may be surprised to hear that I love it. Okay?" Lipstone then disappeared and was not seen at the sessions again. He later summoned Rózsa to his office and reprimanded him for writing "Carnegie Hall music" which had no place in a film. Rózsa took this as a compliment, but Lipstone assured him it was not – and suggested he listen to the music from Madame Curie to learn how to write a proper film score. When Rózsa pointed out that Double Indemnity was a love story, Lipstone suggested his music was more appropriate to The Battle of Russia. Lipstone was convinced that as soon as the studio's Artistic Director Buddy DeSylva heard the music he would throw it out. At a screening soon after, DeSylva called him over; expecting heads to roll, Lipstone eagerly huddled with his chief – only to have DeSylva praise the music, saying it was exactly the dissonant, hard-hitting score the film needed. The boss's only criticism: There was not enough of it. By this time, Lipstone had an arm around DeSylva, asking unctuously "I always find you the right guy for the job, Buddy, don't I?"

The score was nominated for an Academy Award, and the success brought Rózsa offers to do as many films as he had time for.

Locations

The house can still be seen today; it is located at 6301 Quebec Drive in the Beachwood Canyon neighborhood of Los Angeles. The production team copied the interior of the house, including the spiral staircase, almost exactly on a soundstage at Paramount.

Interiors of the Pacific All Risk Insurance Company were filmed in the Bradbury Building, a location that has since become one of the most famous shoot locations in Los Angeles.

For years, it was believed the exterior of the train station in the film was the Mission Revival Style Southern Pacific Railroad Depot in Glendale, California built in 1923, but the scene was filmed at the Southern Pacific Railroad Station, located at 201 N. Front Street, Burbank, bearing a prop sign that read Glendale. That station no longer exists; the Burbank Metrolink station now stands on the site. The Glendale station remains, however, and can now be seen as part of the Glendale Transportation Center. It was added to the National Register of Historic Places on May 2, 1997.

Other locations around Los Angeles used in the film were an apartment building at 1825 N. Kingsley Drive in Hollywood where Walter Neff lived and the building on the southwest corner of Hollywood Blvd. and Western. That building still stands, but the Newman Drug Store originally on the ground floor is no longer there.

Release
Double Indemnitys first theatrical engagement was at the Keith's in Baltimore, on July 3, 1944. The film then opened nationwide on July 6, 1944, and was an immediate hit with audiences – despite a campaign by singer Kate Smith imploring the public to stay away on moral grounds. James M. Cain recalled "there was a little trouble caused by this fat girl, Kate Smith, who carried on a propaganda asking people to stay away from the picture. Her advertisement probably put a million dollars on its gross."

It was not uncommon at the time for studios to take out ads in trade journals promoting the virtues of their own films. David O. Selznick, no stranger to self-aggrandizement, frequently sought to put a high-culture gloss on his pictures with "trade-book" ads. At just the time Double Indemnity was released, Selznick's Since You Went Away was enjoying some box-office success. In his ads, Selznick quoted various dignitaries claiming it was the finest picture they had ever seen, how it served such a noble purpose, how it elevated humanity to new levels – no high-toned platitude was too lofty to invoke. Indeed, the ad averred, the words Since You Went Away had become "the four most important words uttered in motion picture history since Gone with the Wind." Wilder despised such tactics, so he placed an ad of his own: Double Indemnity, it claimed, were the two most important words uttered in motion picture history since Broken Blossoms. Selznick was not amused and threatened to stop advertising in any of the trades if they continued to run Wilder's ads.

Reception

Reviews
Reviews from the critics were largely positive, though the content of the story made some uncomfortable. While some reviewers found the story implausible and disturbing, others praised it as an original thriller. In his mixed review of the film in The New York Times, film critic Bosley Crowther called the picture "Steadily diverting, despite its monotonous pace and length." He complained that the two lead characters "lack the attractiveness to render their fate of emotional consequence", but also felt the movie possessed a "realism reminiscent of the bite of past French films".

Howard Barnes at the New York Herald Tribune was much more enthusiastic, calling Double Indemnity "one of the most vital and arresting films of the year", and praising Wilder's "magnificent direction and a whale of a script". The trade paper Variety wrote that the film "sets a new standard for screen treatment in its category".

Radio host and Hearst paper columnist Louella Parsons said "Double Indemnity is the finest picture of its kind ever made, and I make that flat statement without any fear of getting indigestion later from eating my words."

The Brooklyn Eagle was highly complimentary: “Besides MacMurray, who shows up as a top flight dramatic actor in a role that is a new type for him, and Miss Stanwyck, who has never given a more striking performance, ‘Double Indemnity’ has a third standout star, Edward G. Robinson, in his best role in many a film....By the way, there’s no need to warn the teenagers away from this one; they wouldn’t skip it in any case, and besides, ‘Double Indemnity’ makes it beautifully clear that murder doesn’t pay—and certainly the insurance company doesn’t, without sharp investigation.” 

Philip K. Scheur, the Los Angeles Times movie critic, ranked it with The Human Comedy, The Maltese Falcon, and Citizen Kane as Hollywood trailblazers, and Alfred Hitchcock wrote to Wilder saying that "Since Double Indemnity, the two most important words in motion pictures are 'Billy' and 'Wilder.

The film's critical reputation has only grown over the years. In 1977, Leslie Halliwell gave it a 4-star (top) rating, and wrote: "Brilliantly filmed and incisively written, perfectly capturing the decayed Los Angeles atmosphere of a Chandler novel, but using a simpler story and more substantial characters." In a 1998 review for his "Great Films" series, film critic Roger Ebert thought the romance between MacMurray and Stanwyck showed "little psychological depth", while MacMurray and Robinson showed the "genuine emotion" of a surrogate father-son relationship that represented the film's heart. Ebert praised director Wilder and cinematographer Seitz. He wrote "The photography by John F. Seitz helped develop the noir style of sharp-edged shadows and shots, strange angles and lonely Edward Hopper settings."

Rob Fraser from Empire called the film “Film noir at its finest, a template of the genre, etc. Billy Wilder in full swing, Barbara Stanwyck's finest hour, and Fred MacMurray makes a great chump.”

On review aggregator Rotten Tomatoes, the film holds a 97% approval rating with an average rating of 9.1/10, based on 105 reviews. On Metacritic, the film has a weighted average score of 95 out of 100 based on 18 critics, indicating "universal acclaim".

Academy Award nominations
At the 17th Academy Awards on March 15, 1945, Double Indemnity was nominated for seven Oscars, but did not win any.

Filmed and released during the dark days of World War II, the film was not popular with the Academy. Wilder went to the awards ceremony expecting to win,  even though the studio had been backing its other big hit of the year, Leo McCarey's Going My Way, and studio employees were expected to vote for the studio favorite. As the awards show wore on and Double Indemnity lost in category after category, it became evident that there would be a Going My Way sweep. McCarey beamed as his picture won award after award, and when he was named Best Director, Wilder could no longer take it. When McCarey made his way to the stage to accept the award for best picture, Wilder, sitting on the aisle, stuck out his foot and tripped him. "Mr. McCarey ... stumbled perceptibly," he gleefully recalled. After the ceremony while he and his wife Judith were waiting for his limousine to arrive, he yelled so loudly that everybody could hear him: "What the hell does the Academy Award mean, for God's sake? After all – Luise Rainer won it two times. Luise Rainer!"

Other awards
American Film Institute included the film on these lists:
 1998: AFI's 100 Years ... 100 Movies – #38
 2001: AFI's 100 Years ... 100 Thrills – #24
 2002: AFI's 100 Years ... 100 Passions – #84
 2003: AFI's 100 Years ... 100 Heroes and Villains:
 Phyllis Dietrichson, Villain #8
 2007: AFI's 100 Years ... 100 Movies (10th Anniversary Edition) – #29

In 1998 the film was ranked at No. 43 in Time Out magazine's poll of Top 100 films of all time. In 1999 Entertainment Weekly voted it at No. 50 on their list of 100 Greatest Movies of All Time. In January 2002, the film was voted at No. 29 on the list of the "Top 100 Essential Films of All Time" by the National Society of Film Critics. The film was included in Times All-Time 100 best movies list in 2005. The Writers Guild of America ranked the film's screenplay the 26th greatest ever. In 2015, Double Indemnity ranked 35th on BBC's "100 Greatest American Films" list, voted on by film critics from around the world.

Film noir
Double Indemnity is an important (and some say the first) example of a genre of films called film noir. According to Robert Sklar, a former chairperson of the Department of Cinema Studies at New York University Tisch School of the Arts, classic film noir is marked by major thematic elements: a plot about a crime told from the point of view of the criminal; exploration of psychosexual themes; and a visually "dark and claustrophobic framing, with key lighting from sources within the mise-en-scène casting strong shadows that both conceal and project characters' feelings".

Double Indemnity has been compared with Wilder's other acclaimed film noir: Sunset Boulevard (1950). The narrative structure in both films begins and ends in the present, but the bulk of the plot is told in flashback narrated by their protagonists. Sklar explains, "[T]he unusual juxtaposition of temporalities gives the spectator a premonition of what will occur/has occurred in the flashback story.  ... Besides Double Indemnity and Detour, voice-over is a key aspect of Mildred Pierce, Gilda, The Lady from Shanghai, and Out of the Past  ... as well as many others." Critic and writer Wendy Lesser notes that the narrator of Sunset Boulevard is dead before he begins narrating, but in Double Indemnity, "the voice-over has a different meaning. It is not the voice of a dead man  ... it is  ... the voice of an already doomed man."

Ironically, Wilder stated: 
I never heard that expression film noir when I made Double Indemnity  ... I just made pictures I would have liked to see. When I was lucky, it coincided with the taste of the audience. With Double Indemnity, I was lucky.

Adaptations
Double Indemnity was adapted as a radio play on two broadcasts of The Screen Guild Theater, first on March 5, 1945 with Fred MacMurray and Barbara Stanwyck, then five years later on February 16, 1950 with Stanwyck and Robert Taylor. It was adapted to the October 15, 1948 broadcast of the Ford Theatre with Burt Lancaster and Joan Bennett and the October 30, 1950 broadcast of Lux Radio Theater with MacMurray and Stanwyck.

Other films inspired by the Snyder-Gray murder include The Postman Always Rings Twice (also based on a Cain novel) and Body Heat (1981). Both Postman and Double Indemnity were remade: Double Indemnity as a television movie in 1973 starring Richard Crenna (who also starred in Body Heat), Lee J. Cobb, and Samantha Eggar; and is included on a bonus disc in the American DVD release of the original film. The Postman Rings remake was a 1981 theatrical release directed by Bob Rafelson and starring Jack Nicholson and Jessica Lange. An Indian film, Jism (2003), was inspired by the film.

Double Indemnity is one of the films parodied in the 1993 film Fatal Instinct; the hero's wife conspires to have him shot on a moving train and fall into a lake so that she can collect on his insurance, which has a "triple indemnity" rider. Carol Burnett parodied the film as "Double Calamity" on her TV show.

Imitators
After the success of Double Indemnity, imitators of the film's plot were rampant. In 1945, Producers Releasing Corporation, one of the B movie studios of Hollywood's Poverty Row, filmed a movie titled Single Indemnity starring Ann Savage and Hugh Beaumont. Released as Apology for Murder, Paramount was not fooled by the title change and quickly obtained an injunction against the film's release that still remains in effect.

So many imitations flooded the market that Cain believed he deserved credit and remuneration. Instead he led a movement within the Screen Writers Guild to create the American Author's Authority, a union that owned its members' works, negotiated better subsidiary deals, and protected against copyright infringement on behalf of its members. This was, however, during the depth of the Red Scare in Hollywood and Guild members rejected the socialist notion.

See also
 List of American films of 1944

Notes

References

External links

Double Indemnity essay by Matt Zoller Seitz at National Film Registry
 The Black Heart of Double Indemnity an essay by Angelica Jade Bastién at The Criterion Collection

 
 
 
 
 Double Indemnity film script at the Internet Movie Script Database
 Double Indemnity: The Complete File story analysis
 Film locations now and then

 Streaming audio
 Double Indemnity on Screen Guild Theater: March 5, 1945
 Double Indemnity on Lux Radio Theater: October 30, 1950

1940s crime thriller films
1944 films
Adultery in films
American black-and-white films
American crime thriller films
Articles containing video clips
1940s English-language films
Film noir
Films about capital punishment
Films about murder
Films based on American novels
Films based on works by James M. Cain
Films directed by Billy Wilder
Films scored by Miklós Rózsa
Films set in 1938
Films set in Los Angeles
Films shot in Los Angeles
Films with screenplays by Billy Wilder
Films with screenplays by Raymond Chandler
Paramount Pictures films
United States National Film Registry films
Universal Pictures films
1940s American films